The International Racquetball Federation's 20th Racquetball World Championships were held in Guatemala City, Guatemala from November 26 to December 6, 2021. This is the first time Worlds have been in Guatemala, and the second consecutive time a Central American country has hosted the event after Costa Rica in 2018.

In 2021, Mexicans Paola Longoria and Samantha Salas won their fourth World Championship in women's doubles, which is the most by a partnership. They are now tied for 2nd most Worlds doubles titles with fellow Mexicans Alvaro Beltran and Javier Moreno. Longoria and Salas defeated Americans Kelani Lawrence and Rhonda Rajsich in the final, 15-14, 15-6.

Tournament format
The 2021 World Championships was a two-stage competition. There was an initial group stage played as a round robin with the results used to seed teams for the medal round.

Group stage

Pool A

Pool B

Pool C

Medal round

References

Racquetball competitions